Winnington Park Rugby Football Club is a rugby union club situated in Winnington, Northwich in Cheshire,  England.  The club runs three senior sides, a Ladies team, two colts sides and ten junior teams  The first XV currently plays in the Northern Division, in North 2 West following their promotion from South Lancs/Cheshire 2 as champions at the end of the 2017–18 season.

Rugby Union
The club was founded in 1907 as a rugby union club.

Dewi Morris played for Winnington Park before moving on in his career and gaining caps with the England team.

Winnington Park rugby club is a few hundred yards across the park from its neighbours Northwich Rugby Club.

Rugby League
Weaverham Rangers rugby league club played in the North West Counties League until 2005. Weaverham Rangers became Winnington Park and joined the Rugby League Conference in 2006. Winnington Park had previously hosted a rugby league in the past when Crewe Wolves temporarily played there.

Winnington Park moved to neighbours Northwich RUFC and became Northwich Stags in 2008, the team won the Cheshire Division of the Conference but after 2009 in the Rugby League Merit League the club folded.

Club honours
North 1 champions: 1987–88
Cheshire Cup winners (5): 1988, 1990, 1991, 1993, 1994
Cheshire Bowl winners (3): 2010, 2011, 2018
South Lancs/Cheshire 2 champions: 2017–18

References

External links
Winnington Park rugby football club website

English rugby union teams
Sports venues in Cheshire
Winnington Park Rugby Football Club
Rugby League Conference teams
1907 establishments in England
Rugby clubs established in 1907
Rugby league teams in Cheshire
Rugby union in Cheshire